Kotrag Nunatak (Nunatak Kotrag \'nu-na-tak ko-'trag\) is a conspicuous rocky peak of elevation 290 m projecting from Murgash Glacier, Greenwich Island in the South Shetland Islands, Antarctica.  It was named after Khan Kotrag, founder of the Kingdom of Volga Bulgaria in the 7th Century AD.

Location

Maps
 L.L. Ivanov et al. Antarctica: Livingston Island and Greenwich Island, South Shetland Islands. Scale 1:100000 topographic map. Sofia: Antarctic Place-names Commission of Bulgaria, 2005.
 L.L. Ivanov. Antarctica: Livingston Island and Greenwich, Robert, Snow and Smith Islands. Scale 1:120000 topographic map.  Troyan: Manfred Wörner Foundation, 2009.

References
 Kotrag Nunatak. SCAR Composite Antarctic Gazetteer
 Bulgarian Antarctic Gazetteer. Antarctic Place-names Commission. (details in Bulgarian, basic data in English)

External links
 Kotrag Nunatak. Copernix satellite image

Nunataks of Greenwich Island